Nyurba (Ñurba ) is a town and the administrative center of Nyurbinsky District of the Sakha Republic, Russia, located on the Vilyuy River, a right-hand tributary of the Lena,  northwest of Yakutsk, the capital of the republic. As of the 2010 Census, its population was 10,157.

History
Nyurba was founded in 1930, although the area has been settled since the mid-18th century. In the 1950s, it grew rapidly as a base for exploration of the nearby diamond deposits, and was granted urban-type settlement status in 1958. Town status was granted to it in 1997.

Administrative and municipal status
Within the framework of administrative divisions, Nyurba serves as the administrative center of Nyurbinsky District. As an inhabited locality, Nyurba is classified as a town under republic jurisdiction. As an administrative division, it is incorporated within Nyurbinsky District as the Town of Nyurba. As a municipal division, the Town of Nyurba is incorporated within Nyurbinsky Municipal District as Nyurba Urban Settlement.

Economy
Production of diamonds is the primary industry in the town, both as the site of a diamond cutting works operated by the state-owned ALROSA company and as its status as a supply town for nearby mining operations.

Transport
Nyurba is served by the Nyurba Airport  and a river port.

Climate
Nyurba has an extremely cold subarctic climate (Köppen climate classification: Dfc).

References

Notes

Sources
Official website of the Sakha Republic. Registry of the Administrative-Territorial Divisions of the Sakha Republic. Nyurbinsky District. 

Cities and towns in the Sakha Republic